The Lokayukta (also Lok Ayukta) ( lokāyukta, "civil commissioner")  is the Indian Parliamentary Ombudsman, executed into power, through and for, each of the State Governments of India.   It is brought into effect in a state, after passing the Lokayukta Act in respective state Legislature and a person of reputable background is nominated to the post. The post is created to quickly address grievances against the working integrity  and efficiency of the government or its administration (public servants). Once appointed, Lokayukta 
cannot be dismissed or transferred by the government, and can only be removed by passing an impeachment motion by the state assembly, making it a powerful deterrent against  corruption and mal-administration of the governing system.

The Administrative Reform Commission for Redressal of Citizen's Grievances submitted its interim report to the prime minister in October,1966 with recommendations to set up the Institution of Lokayukta in each of the States to investigate complaints against administrative actions and to improve the standard of public administration in India through investigation of complaints against administrative actions, which includes complaints of corruption, favouritism and indiscipline as other existing systems to handle these issues, namely courts, departmental authorities and other avenues were not sufficient to deal with issues of corruption other malpractices by public servants and therefore, an alternative and efficient system machinery was needed.

In 1968, the Government of India on the basis of the Administrative Reforms Commission report and its recommendation established the institution  of Lokayukta on the pattern of the Ombudsman Institution and introduced a Bill which provided for appointment of Lok-Pal and his deputies at National level and included Lokayukta for the States. Though the bill passed in the Lok Sabha (Lower House) it could not be passed in the Rajya Sabha (Upper House). However, the Bill formed the basis of legislation in several States for the creation of Lokayukta and the provisions of the Lokayukta Acts varied from one State to another. As a result of this, resolutions were adopted in the 1st All India Lokayukta and Upa-Lokayuktas Conference held in Shimla, to keep a uniformity in the provisions of various Acts of the states and the same was reiterated in the All India Lokayukta and Upa-Lokayuktas Conference held in Bhopal on 9th and 10 October 2010. As it was resolved that uniformity in the Acts of all the States is necessary and hence it was planned that this would be feasible only by a Central Legislation.

Naresh Kadyan moved public interest litigation before High Court and then contempt of court order petition for not appointing Lokayukta in Haryana.
The Administrative Reforms Commission (ARC) headed by Morarji Desai submitted a special interim report on "Problems of Redressal of Citizen's Grievances" in 1966. In this report, the ARC recommended the setting up of two special authorities designated as 'Lokpal' and 'Lokayukta' for the redressal of citizens' grievances.

The Lokayukta, along with the Income Tax Department and the Anti Corruption Bureau, mainly helps people publicise corruption among the Politicians and Government Officials. Many acts of the LokAyukta have resulted in criminal or other consequences for those charged.

Maharashtra was the first state to introduce the institution of Lokayukta through The Lokayukta and Upa-Lokayuktas Act in 1971. This was followed by similar acts that were enacted by the states of Odisha, Rajasthan, Bihar, Uttar Pradesh, Karnataka, Madhya Pradesh, Andhra Pradesh, Gujarat, Kerala, Tamil Nadu and the union territory of Delhi. Powers of Lokayukta in each state are different and efforts are being made to make them uniform.

Appointment 
The Lokayukta is appointed by the Governor of the State, through nomination by its Chief Minister (in consensus with Chief justice of the State High Court, Leaders of the Opposition in the Legislative Assembly and Legislative Council, Speaker of the Legislative Assembly and Chairman of the Legislative Council). Once appointed, Lokayukta can not be dismissed nor transferred by the government, and can only be removed by passing an impeachment motion by the state assembly. Any person who is a judge or a retired Chief Justice or a retired judge of the High Court is eligible to be appointed as Lokayukta.

History

Lokayukta/Lokayog in Indian states 

There are no Lokayuktas in Jammu and Kashmir and Puducherry. Lokayukta was enacted in Tamil Nadu on 13 July 2018 and was established on 13 November 2018, the Arunachal Pradesh assembly passed a Lokayukta bill On 4 March 2014, the Mizoram assembly passed a Lokayukta Bill in March 2019

Role in combating corruption and maladministration 

The Lokpal and Lokayukta Act 2013, makes it compulsory for each state to appoint Lokayukta similar to Lokpal at central level for investigation into complaints of corruption against government officers in public offices. As per the Act the institution should have both Judicial and Non-Judicial members. Lokayukta investigates cases of corruption committed at state level, and once proved recommends action. It is a great check on corruption, brings about transparency in the system, makes administrative machinery citizen friendly. His functions largely depend upon jurisdiction vested in him and facilities provided for taking cognizance of citizens’ grievances promptly, dexterously and expeditiously through simple, informal mechanism devoid of technicalities.

Institution of Lokpal has not as yet been created at the centre, although efforts have been made since 1959. Meanwhile, Lokayuktas/Lokpal have been established by many states through state legislations. They provide for inquiry/investigation into complaints of corruption against public servants. He protects Citizens’ Right against mal-administration, corruption, delay, inefficiency, non-transparency, abuse of position, improper conduct etc. To keep the powers of Lokayukta neutral and non-biased provision for fixed tenure is made. The procedure to be followed is informal and inexpensive; technicalities do not come in way. Complaint is supported by affidavit, making out case for inquiry. He is representative of Legislature, powerful friend of citizens to act against officials action, inaction or corruption. But not anti-administration, rather helps in humanizing relations between the public and the administration, a step forward in establishing an ‘Open Government’ securing respect for the rule of law, an educator aiming at propagating the prevention of corruption, inefficiency and mal-administration in governance. He is, therefore, a check on corruption.

Constitutional Amendment for Effectiveness
An amendment to the Constitution has been proposed to implement the Lokayukta uniformly across Indian states. The proposed changes will make the institution of Lokayukta uniform across the country as a three-member body, headed by a retired Supreme Court judge or high court chief justice and comprising the state vigilance commissioner and a jurist or an eminent administrator as other members.

Reforms 
In November 2012, after conclusion of the 11th All India Lokayukta Conference, as many as 16 Lokayuktas sent many recommendations to the Govt of India. The recommendations were:

 Make Lokayukta the nodal agency for receiving all corruption complaints.
 Accord Lokayukta jurisdiction over State-level probe agencies.
 Bring bureaucrats under the ambit of the Lokayuktas.
 Accord powers of search and seizure and powers to initiate contempt proceedings.
 Provide Lokayukta administrative and financial autonomy.
 Bring Non-Governmental Organisations (NGO) funded by the government under Lokayukta's jurisdiction.

Impact 

The report of Retd. Justice Santosh Hegde the then incumbent Lokayukta of Karnataka (2011) resulted in the unseating of the Chief Minister of Karnataka from his position.

See also 
 The Lokpal and Lokayuktas Act, 2013
 Lokpal
 Citizen's Charter and Grievance Redressal Bill, 2011
 Jan Lokpal Bill
 2011 Indian anti-corruption movement

References

Anti-corruption measures in India
Anti-corruption agencies
Ombudsman posts